Jablaniški Potok is a small settlement at the source and upper course of Jablanica Creek in the hills east of Šmartno pri Litiji in central Slovenia. The area is part of the historical region of Lower Carniola. The Municipality of Šmartno pri Litiji is included in the Central Slovenia Statistical Region.

References

External links
Jablaniški Potok at Geopedia

Populated places in the Municipality of Šmartno pri Litiji